Roman Sedláček (born 12 February 1963 in Těšany) is a Czech football coach and a former player. He played for his country five times between 1990 and 1991. Besides Czech Republic, he has played in Germany.

References

External links
 

1963 births
Living people
People from Brno-Country District
Czech footballers
Czech football managers
Czechoslovak footballers
Czechoslovakia international footballers
Dukla Prague footballers
SK Sigma Olomouc players
FC Hansa Rostock players
Eintracht Braunschweig players
MFK Vítkovice players
FK Jablonec players
FC Fastav Zlín players
VfB Remscheid players
Expatriate footballers in Germany
Czechoslovak expatriate footballers
Czechoslovak expatriate sportspeople in Germany
Czech expatriate footballers
Czech expatriate sportspeople in Germany
Association football forwards
1. FC Neubrandenburg 04 players
Sportspeople from the South Moravian Region